The Bloomfield Avenue station is an open-cut station on the Newark City Subway Line of the Newark Light Rail, located at Bloomfield Avenue on the west side of Branch Brook Park, near its main entrance. Connections are available here for Bloomfield Avenue bus service on four lines for service between Newark and Paterson, Wayne, Montclair, West Caldwell, and Parsippany-Troy Hills. The station has elevators for handicapped passengers.

History
Bloomfield Avenue station was originally built by Public Service Corporation of New Jersey on May 26, 1935, and contained a connection to the Bloomfield Avenue line until March 30, 1952 when the route was converted into bus route no. 29.

Transfers
New Jersey Transit buses: 11, 28, 29, 72

References

External links

 Bloomfield Avenue entrance from Google Maps Street View

Newark Light Rail stations
Railway stations in the United States opened in 1935
1935 establishments in New Jersey